Juliet Ibrahim is a Ghanaian actress, film producer and singer of Lebanese, Ghanaian and Liberian descent. She won the Best Actress in a Leading Role award at the 2010 Ghana Movie Awards for her role in 4 Play. She has been referred to as the "Most Beautiful West African Woman" according to A-listers Magazine.

Early life
Juliet Ibrahim was born to a Lebanese father and a Ghanaian-Liberian mother. She is the oldest child and has two sisters including the actress Sonia Ibrahim, and a brother. Juliet and with her siblings spent the longest part of their childhood in Lebanon and Ivory Coast due to civil wars. She had her primary education in Lebanon, then proceeded to Ivory Coast for her secondary education where she lived with her parents. She studied at the Ghana Institute of Languages, where she studied English, French and Spanish. She also studied marketing, Advertising and Public Relations at the Ghana Institute of Journalism.

Ibrahim has commented that in Africa she is not regarded as a black woman because of her skin tone, but outside Africa she is recognized as being black. She objected to the term 'half-caste' and said that she was 'Black and proud of it'.

Career
Ibrahim made her acting debut in the 2005 film Crime to Christ starring Majid Michel. Her first Nollywood film was Yankee Boys and she has features in more than 50 films afterward. In 2014 she produced her first film Number One Fan, where she stars as an actress being stalked on by a fan in the film. Her second movie Shattered Romance which features Nigerian and Ghanaian actors, launched amidst fanfare in Accra, Ghana on 5 December 2014. Her new TV series; Every Woman Has A Story where she debuted her directorial skills is airing on Terrestrial TV and her new reality show, The Perfect Assistant, will be unveiled soon. She has also featured in Twi movies, in Yoruba language films, and also in Ladan Aure, a Hausa Language film.

Filmography

Awards

 2010: Achievement Award – City People Magazine, Accra
 2010: Ghana Movie Personality of the Year – City People Magazine, Lagos
 2010: Best Lead Actress in a movie – Ghana Movie Awards
 2014: Best Ghanaian Actress – City People Entertainment
 2016: Actress of the year – Starzzawards

See also
List of Ghanaian actors

References

External links

Juliet Ibrahim Foundation

Ghanaian film actresses
Ghanaian people of Lebanese descent
Ghanaian people of Liberian descent
Musicians from Accra
Living people
Ghanaian film producers
Ghanaian women film producers
Actresses in Yoruba cinema
Year of birth missing (living people)